The 2021 FIVB Volleyball Women's U20 World Championship was the 21st edition of the FIVB Volleyball Women's U20 World Championship, contested by the women's national teams under the age of 20 of the members of the  (FIVB), the sport's global governing body. The final tournament was held in Belgium and Netherlands, making it the first time that the tournament was jointly hosted by more than one country.

The defending champions, Japan, withdrew from the event.

Qualification
A total of 16 teams qualified for the final tournament. In addition to Belgium and Netherlands, who qualified automatically as the hosts, another 10 teams qualified via five separate continental tournaments which were required to be held by 31 December 2020 at the latest. However, due to the ongoing global COVID-19 pandemic and the subsequent impact on some Confederations’ ability to organize the events within the given deadline, the FIVB decided to postpone the deadline for continental qualifications to 28 February 2021. Additionally, in the case of no Continental Confederations being able to hold qualifying events, teams were to qualify according to the respective Continental Rankings. The remaining 4 teams qualified via the FIVB Junior World Ranking.

* China and Japan withdrew from the competition. Thailand entered by the 3rd place at the Asian Volleyball Championship and Belarus entered by the world ranking.

** Cuba was forced to withdraw from the competition due to COVID-19 infections and was replaced by Puerto Rico.

Pools composition
Teams were seeded in the first two positions of each pool following the serpentine system according to their FIVB U20 World Ranking as of 1 March 2021. FIVB reserved the right to seed the hosts as head of pools A and B regardless of the U20 World Ranking. All teams not seeded were drawn to take other available positions in the remaining lines, following the U20 World Ranking. The draw was held on 14 June 2021. Rankings are shown in brackets except the hosts who ranked both 22nd.

* Cuba withdrew due to COVID-19 concerns and was replaced by Puerto Rico.

** The teams changed their groups after the draw because a policy about immigration of Belgium ban the people from Argentina, Brazil and Russia.

Squads

Venues

Pool standing procedure
 Number of matches won
 Match points
 Sets ratio
 Points ratio
 If the tie continues as per the point ratio between two teams, the priority will be given to the team which won the last match between them. When the tie in points ratio is between three or more teams, a new classification of these teams in the terms of points 1, 2, and 3 will be made taking into consideration only the matches in which they were opposed to each other.

Match won 3–0 or 3–1: 3 match points for the winner, 0 match points for the loser
Match won 3–2: 2 match points for the winner, 1 match point for the loser

Preliminary round
All times are Central European Summer Time (UTC+02:00).

Pool A

|}

|}

Pool B

|}
* Puerto Rico was forced to withdraw after several team members tested positive for COVID-19 and their games were forfeited.

|}

Pool C

|}

|}

Pool D

 

|}

|}

Second round
All times are Central European Summer Time (UTC+02:00).

Classification 1–8

Pool E

|}

|}

Pool F

|}

|}

Classification 9–16

Pool G

|}

|}

Pool H

|}

|}

Final round
All times are Central European Summer Time (UTC+02:00).

Classification 13th–16th

13th–16th semifinals

|}

15th place match

|}

13th place match

|}

Classification 9th–12th

9th–12th semifinals

|}

11th place match

|}

9th place match

|}

Classification 5th–8th

5th–8th semifinals

|}

7th place match

|}

5th place match

|}

Final four

Semifinals

|}

3rd place match

|}

Final

|}

Final standing

Awards

Most Valuable Player
 Gaia Guiducci
Best Setter
 Gaia Guiducci
Best Outside Spikers
 Loveth Omoruyi
 Jolien Knollema

Best Middle Blockers
 Emma Graziani
 Hena Kurtagic
Best Opposite Spiker
 Vita Akimova
Best Libero
 Martina Armini

See also
2021 FIVB Volleyball Men's U21 World Championship

References

External links
Official website

FIVB Volleyball Women's U20 World Championship
FIVB Volleyball Women's U20 World Championship
International volleyball competitions hosted by Belgium
International volleyball competitions hosted by the Netherlands
FIVB
FIVB
FIVB
FIVB